Isabel West, also known as Isabelle West (1858 – July 22, 1942) was an American film actress in the late 1910s and early 1920s. She began her career in 1916 as Mrs. Harris in The Blue Envelope Mystery.

She died in Brentwood, Long Island, New York, US.

Filmography 
 The Blue Envelope Mystery (1916) as Mrs. Harris (as Isabelle West) 
 Kitty MacKay (1917) as Lady Inglehart
 The Weavers of Life (1917) as Hal's Mother
 The Firing Line (1919) as Mrs. Cardross
 The Price of Possession (1921) as Mrs. Poore
 A Sainted Devil (1924) as Doña Encarnación
 Old Home Week (1925) as Mrs. Clark

References

External links 
 Isabel West at the AFI Catalog
 
 IBDb.com as Isabel West
 IBDb.com as Isabelle West

American silent film actresses
1858 births
1942 deaths
American film actresses
20th-century American actresses